Fascist Legacy is a 1989 BBC documentary TV miniseries about Italian war crimes during World War II. It consists of two parts.

The first part itself consists of two sections and was aired on 1 November 1989, on BBC, under the title A Promise Fulfilled.

Part one
Pietro Badoglio's use of mustard gas and his ordering of bombing of Red Cross-operated hospitals is shown in the first section. The emphasis is placed upon Italian war crimes committed during the Italian invasions of Ethiopia. The Italian revenge massacres after an attempted assassination of the Italian governor of Ethiopia are shown.

Italian war crimes committed against Slovene and Croatian civilians on the Italian-occupied territory of Kingdom of Yugoslavia are shown in the second section of the first part. The Rab concentration camp witnesses and atrocities in the Croatian village of Podhum near Rijeka are shown.

Part two
The second part, called A Pledge Betrayed, aired on 8 November 1989, exposes British (and American) hypocrisy, which prevented extradition of 1,200 Italian war criminals (the most wanted were Pietro Badoglio, Mario Roatta and Rodolfo Graziani), for whom Yugoslavia, Greece and Ethiopia provided full documentation of their crimes.

The documentary's cynical conclusion is Churchill's quote about "the better tomorrow with a new world order."

Historical truth
If Italian officers were prosecuted by the (British controlled) court at all, they were accused only of the death of the British prisoners of war, but not of the death of the civil population in occupied territories. It was on 9 September 1943, the day of Allies' invasion of the Italian mainland, when anti-fascist Nicola Bellomo then commander of the XII MVSN Zone, formed a makeshift Italian force and counterattacked Germans that tried to occupy the port of Bari . In this successful defence action, general Nicola Bellomo was wounded. As an anti-fascist, general Bellomo may have been considered a threat to the Badoglio government. Nicola Bellomo, as a gesture of military honour, preferred not to escape from the prison when the door was intentionally left open, after he was sentenced to death.

Non-prosecution of Italian war criminals
Yugoslavia, Greece and Ethiopia requested extradition of 1,200 Italian war criminals who were however never prosecuted because the British and American governments with the beginning of cold war saw in Pietro Badoglio a guarantee of an anti-communist post-war Italy.

Italian public media
Italian public television RAI bought a copy of the film but for years it was never shown to an Italian audience because it would have challenged the prevailing view, which focused on the role of the Italian partisans fighting the Germans, and, while pointing at the Foibe massacres, not knowing or refusing to acknowledge Italian war crimes against ethnic Slovene civil population, a view that largely survives to this day, unlike in France where the memory of the French Resistance and that of Vichy France are both known to the public.

After in the 1950s two Italian film-makers were jailed for depicting the Italian invasion of Greece, the Italian public and media were forced into the repression of collective memory, which led to historical amnesia and eventually to historical revisionism.

In 2004 only the Italian private channel La7 has shown large excerpts of "Fascist Legacy". Showings of the documentary were also organized in Italy by groups with an anti-fascist orientation and members of the Slovene minority in Italy.

See also
 Pacification of Libya
 Second Italo-Ethiopian War
 Italian invasion of Yugoslavia
 Italian invasion of Greece
 Italian concentration camps
 Italian war crimes
 Province of Ljubljana

References

External links

Rory, Carroll. Italy's bloody secret. The Guardian. (Archived by WebCite®), The Guardian, London, UK, 25 June 2003
Fascist Legacy di Ken Kirby, Gran Bretagna, 1989, Il Pane e le Rose, 16 November 2005 (many Italian newspapers articles referenced at the end)
Da “FASCIST LEGACY” a “L’OLOCAUSTO RIMOSSO”: il libro ritrovato di Michael Palumbo From "FASCIST LEGACY" to "THE HOLOCAUST REMOVED": Michael Palumbo's book rediscovered  (in Italian)

1989 British television series debuts
1989 British television series endings
1980s British documentary television series
English-language television shows
British documentary television series
Documentary films alleging war crimes
Documentary films about Italy
Documentary films about politics
Films set in Ethiopia
Television shows set in Croatia
BBC television documentaries about history during the 20th Century
Documentary television series about World War II